Gábor Danyi (born 18 February 1964) is a Hungarian former handball player and coach. Besides his trainer certificate, he also has a teaching degree in geography and physical education.

He coached Hungary at the 2020 European Women's Handball Championship.

Career
In the summer of 2018, he replaced Ambros Martín as head coach of Győri Audi ETO KC. In his very first season as the head coach, the team – beside winning all the trophies possible – remained unbeaten in the domestic competitions as well as in the Champions League.

He was nominated for the 2019 IHF World Coach of The Year award.

Achievements

Coach 
EHF Champions League
: 2019

Nemzeti Bajnokság I
: 2019

Magyar Kupa
: 2019

Nemzeti Bajnokság I/B (men's)
: 2009, 2010

Nemzeti Bajnokság I/B (women's)
: 2002, 2004

References

1964 births
Living people
Sportspeople from Pécs
Hungarian male handball players
Hungarian handball coaches
Handball coaches of international teams